The following people were born in, residents of, or otherwise closely associated with Charleston, South Carolina, United States (categorized by area in which each person is best known):

Academia

 Rick Brewer (born 1956), former administrator at Charleston Southern University; current president of Louisiana College in Pineville, Louisiana 
 Robert Furchgott (1916–2009), biochemist and Nobel Laureate
 Ernest Everett Just (1883–1941), biologist
 Elias Marks (1790–1886), founder of South Carolina Female Collegiate Institute
 William Ephraim Mikell (1868–1944), Dean of the University of Pennsylvania Law School, a summer home in Charleston
 William Charles Wells (1757–1817), physician

Athletes

 Jarrell Brantley (born 1996), basketball player
 Luther Broughton (born 1974), NFL player
 Nehemiah Broughton (born 1982), NFL player
 Kwame Brown (born 1982), basketball player
 Jasmine Camacho-Quinn (born 1996), Olympic gold medalist/ hurdler
 Garrett Chisolm (born 1988), NFL player
 Beth Daniel (born 1956), professional golfer
 Zola Davis (born 1975), NFL and XFL player
 Carlos Dunlap (born 1989), NFL player
 Oronde Gadsden (born 1971), NFL player
 A. J. Green (born 1988), NFL player
 Harold Green (born 1968), NFL player
 Anthony Johnson (born 1974), NBA player
Javon Kinlaw (born 1997), NFL player
 Katrina McClain Johnson (born 1965), Olympic gold medalist; retired WNBA player
 Byron Maxwell (born 1988), NFL player
 Tre McLean (born 1993), basketball player in the Israeli Basketball Premier League
 David Meggett (born 1966), NFL player
 Khris Middleton (born 1991), NBA player
 Bud Moore (born 1941), NASCAR driver
 Langston Moore (born 1981), former NFL player
 Ovie Mughelli (born 1980), NFL player
 Josh Powell (born 1983), NBA player
 Laron Profit (born 1977), NBA player
 Robert Quinn (born 1990), NFL player
 Vicente Reyes (born 2003), USL player
 Edmond Robinson (born 1992), NFL player
 Art Shell (born 1946), NFL player and coach
 Brandon Shell (born 1992), NFL player
 Gorman Thomas (born 1950), MLB player
 Roddy White (born 1981), NFL player
 Dennis Williams (born 1965), basketball player

Entertainers

 Angry Grandpa (1950–2017), internet personality
 Ckay1 (born 1982), music composer, arranger, and producer
 Stephen Colbert (born 1964), comedian
 Jonathan Mangum (born 1976), actor
 Joel Derfner (born 1973), musical theater composer
 Andy Dick (born 1965), comedian
 Thomas Gibson (born 1962), actor
 Shanola Hampton (born 1977), actress
 Bertha Hill (1905–1950),  blues and vaudeville singer
 Lauren Hutton (born 1943), actress
 Mabel King (1932–1999), actress
 Logan Marshall-Green (born 1976), actor
 Micah McLaurin (born 1994), pianist
 Will Patton (born 1954), actor
 Grace Peixotto (born 1817), madam
 Mackenzie Rosman (born 1989), actress
 Darius Rucker (born 1966), lead singer of Hootie & the Blowfish, and country star
 Josh Strickland (born 1983), singer and actor
 Elise Testone (born 1983), singer, American Idol contestant
 Melanie Thornton (1967–2001), singer, member of La Bouche
 Matt Watson (born 1996), YouTuber, Member and Co-Founder of SuperMega

Military figures

 Arthur L. Bristol (1886–1942), United States Navy vice admiral
 Mark Wayne Clark (1896–1984), United States Army general; Supreme commander of the United Nations Command
 James H. Conyers (1855–1935), first black person admitted to the United States Naval Academy
 Frank L. Culbertson Jr. (born 1949), former naval officer and aviator, test pilot, aerospace engineer, and NASA astronaut
 Percival Drayton (1812–1865), United States Navy officer, commanded Union Naval forces during the Civil War
 Thomas Drayton (1809–1891), Confederate States Army general, brother of Percival Drayton
 Samuel Wragg Ferguson (1834–1917), Confederate States Army general
 James L. Holloway III (1922–2019), United States Navy admiral and navy aviator
 Benjamin Huger (1805–1877), Confederate States Army general
 Ralph H. Johnson (1949–1968), United States Marine who posthumously received the Medal of Honor
 John Laurens (1754–1782), soldier and statesman from South Carolina during the American Revolutionary War
 Stephen Dill Lee (1833–1908), Confederate States Army general; 1st president of Mississippi State University 
 Barnwell R. Legge (1891–1949), United States Army general during World War I
 Robert Charlwood Richardson Jr. (1882–1954), United States Army general
 William Childs Westmoreland (1914–2005), United States Army general; 25th chief of staff of the United States Army

Political figures

 William Aiken Jr. (1806–1887), Governor of South Carolina
 Judah P. Benjamin (1811–1884), U.S. Senator from Louisiana, Confederate States Secretary of State and Attorney General
 Don C. Bowen (b. 1945), represented District 8 at the South Carolina House of Representative, 2007-2014
 James Francis Byrnes (1879–1972), U.S. Representative and Senator, Associate Justice of the Supreme Court, Secretary of State, and Governor of South Carolina
 Floride Calhoun (1792–1866), Second Lady of the United States; wife of John C. Calhoun
 John C. Calhoun (1782–1850), U.S. Representative and Senator, Vice President, Secretary of State, and Secretary of War
 George Heriot DeReef (1869–1937), American lawyer, political candidate, civil rights leader, and businessman
 Henry William de Saussure (1763–1839), second director of United States Mint; intendant (mayor) of Charleston
 William Drayton Sr. (1733–1790), associate justice of South Carolina Supreme Court
 Christopher Gadsden (1724–1805), American Revolutionary War leader
 James Gadsden (1788–1858), U.S. minister to Mexico; president of the South Carolina Railroad Company
 Francois P. Giraud (1818–1877), Mayor of San Antonio from 1872–1875
 Sarah Moore Grimké (1792–1873), abolitionist, widely held to be the mother of the women's suffrage movement
 Angelina Emily Grimké Weld (1805–1879), abolitionist and political activist
 Robert Young Hayne (1791–1839), Mayor of Charleston 1836–1837; United States Senator 1823–1833; Governor of South Carolina
 Thomas Heyward Jr. (1746–1809), signer of the Declaration of Independence
 Fritz Hollings (1922-2019), United States Senator from South Carolina; Governor and Lieutenant Governor of South Carolina
 Michael Janus (1966-2022), Mississippi state legislator
 James Ladson (1753–1812), American revolutionary and lieutenant governor of South Carolina
 Henry Laurens (1724–1792), American Revolutionary War leader
 Burnet Maybank (1899–1954), Charleston mayor 1931–1935; South Carolina governor 1939–1941; United States Senator from South Carolina
 Christopher Memminger (1803–1888), signer of the Confederate States Constitution; Confederate States Secretary of the Treasury 1861–1864
 Thomas E. Miller, one of only 5 Black congressmen from the South in the Jim Crow era, son of Declaration of Independence signer Thomas Heyward Jr.
 William Porcher Miles (1822–1899), lawyer; Mayor of Charleston 1855-1857; U.S. Representative from South Carolina; member of the Confederate Congress; designed the Confederate battle flag
 Charles Cotesworth Pinckney (1746–1825), American Revolutionary War leader; United States Ambassador to France; Federalist candidate for President in the 1804 and 1808 United States presidential elections
 Joel Roberts Poinsett (1779–1851), botanist, politician, and diplomat; U.S. Representative; United States Ambassador to Mexico, Secretary of War; founded precursor to the Smithsonian Institution; namesake of the poinsettia
 Alonzo J. Ransier, state senator and U.S. congressman; first African-American Lieutenant Governor of South Carolina
 Joseph P. Riley Jr. (born 1943), Mayor of Charleston 1975-2015
 Edward Rutledge, signed the U.S. Declaration of Independence; Governor of South Carolina, 1798-1800
 John Rutledge, President of South Carolina, 1776-1778; Commander and Chief of South Carolina forces during Revolutionary War; Governor of South Carolina, 1779-1782; second Chief Justice of the U.S. Supreme Court; signed the U.S. Constitution
 Benjamin Smith (1717–1770), slave trader, plantation owner, merchant banker, and politician
 James Skivring Smith (1825–1884), President of Liberia, 1871-1872
 George Alfred Trenholm (1807–1876), Confederate States Secretary of the Treasury
 Bill Workman (born 1940), Charleston native; mayor of Greenville, 1983-1995; economic development specialist
Joseph Wragg (1698–1751), pioneer of the large-scale slave trade and politician

Writers and artists

Alexander Aikman (1755–1836), publisher, King's Printer, and House of Assembly member
Louisa Wells Aikman (1755–1831), 18th century author
Frank Birnbaum (1922–2005), 20th century Jewish cantor
 David Carson (born 1956), graphic designer
 Essie B. Cheesborough (1826-1905), writer
 Joel Derfner (born 1973), writer
 Nikki DuBose (born 1985), former model turned author and activist
 Shepard Fairey (born 1970), artist known for Andre the Giant "Obey" and Barack Obama "Hope" stencil pieces
 Arthur Freed (1894–1973),  Hollywood producer, composer, and writer
 Frank Bunker Gilbreth Jr. (1911–2001), author, Cheaper by the Dozen
 Dubose Heyward (1885–1940), writer and lyricist, Porgy and Bess
 Jessica Hische (born 1984), illustrator
 Caroline Howard Jervey (1823–1877), author, poet
 Robert Jordan (1948–2007), novelist, author of The Wheel of Time series
 Alexandra Ripley (1934–2004), author, Scarlett
 Eden Royce, gothic horror writer
 Stella F Simon (1878–1973), photographer
 Philip Simmons (1912–2009), ironworker
 William Gilmore Simms (1806–1870), poet, novelist, and historian
 Merton Simpson, (born 1928), abstract expressionist artist, African art collector, musician
 Frank Lebby Stanton (1857–1927), lyricist; columnist for the Atlanta Constitution; author of the lyrics of "Just Awearyin' for You"
Elizabeth O'Neill Verner (1883–1979), artist, author, lecturer, and preservationist 
 Norb Vonnegut (born 1958), author
 Lily C. Whitaker (1850–1932), educator, writer
Eliza Yonge Wilkinson (1757–?), letter-writer and patriot during the American Revolutionary War

Other

 William Abbott (1790–1843), manager of the New Charleston Theatre 
 Bill Backer (1926–2016), advertising executive know for Coca-Cola campaigns
 Septima Poinsette Clark (1898–1987), educator, civil rights activist; "grandmother" of the Civil Rights Movement"
 Ellsworth "Bumpy" Johnson (1905–1968), well-known African American mob boss
 Sallie Krawcheck (born 1964), Citigroup chief financial officer
 Samuel Maverick (1803–1870), firebrand rancher from whom the term "maverick" was coined
 Robert Mills (1781–1855), architect
 Vanessa Joy Lachey (née Minnillo) (born 1980), Miss USA 1998, MTV VJ, and Entertainment Tonight correspondent
 George B. Rabb (1930–2017), zoologist
 James C. Saltus (1837–1883), carpenter
 David Stahl (1949–2010), conductor
 Elizabeth Timothy (1702–1757), the first female newspaper publisher in America
 Lewis Timothy (1699–1738), first American librarian
 Denmark Vesey (1767–1822), freedman tried and executed for allegedly plotting a slave revolt
 J. Waites Waring (1880–1968), United States District Court for District of South Carolina judge; part of a three-judge panel that heard school desegregation case Briggs v. Elliott
 Reuben Greenberg (1943–2014), first black police chief of Charleston
 Richard Worley, pirate

References

External links
IMDB's List of People from Charleston, SC

Charleston
Charleston, South Carolina